Robert Allen Curtola, CM (April 17, 1943 – June 4, 2016) was a Canadian rock and roll singer and teen idol.

History
Curtola was born in Port Arthur, Ontario, Canada. He began performing at age 15 with a band called Bobby and the Bobcats, singing at high school assemblies. Over the subsequent years, the singer had many songs on the Canadian music charts beginning with "Hand in Hand With You" in 1960. He was backed by the Corvettes, a group who changed their name to The Martels (named after Curtola's manager, Maria Martell).

Curtola went on to record hits such as "Indian Giver", "Aladdin" and his biggest chart topper, "Fortune Teller" in 1962, which was also successful internationally, selling 2.5 million copies. Between 1960 and 1968 he had continual single and album releases on the Tartan label in Canada. The managers and main songwriters were brothers Dyer and Basil Hurdon. The Del-Fi label released some of those singles in the US. He wrote and performed the song "Things go better with Coca-Cola" in 1964 for advertising and was a pitchman for the company.

In 1966 he won a RPM Gold Leaf Award for becoming the first Canadian to have an album go gold. In the early 1970s, Curtola hosted a CTV musical series entitled, Shake, Rock and Roll and Curtola went on to a successful singing career at Las Vegas, Nevada casino venues. In the 1980s, in an attempt at updating his image, Curtola briefly adopted the billing Boby Curtola and released at least two singles under this name before reverting to his original spelling.

During his career, the singer achieved 25 Canadian gold singles and 12 Canadian gold albums. In 1998, in recognition of his long service to the Canadian music industry as well as his humanitarian work, particularly with children's charities, he was made a member of the Order of Canada. His pioneering contribution to the genre has been recognized by the Rockabilly Hall of Fame. Curtola also performed on some Princess Cruises ships in the 1990s but also more recently, in 2014, for example.

In addition to his musical work, Curtola was a business entrepreneur, marketing a brand of tomato clam Caesar cocktail called SeaCzar for three years. Curtola founded companies that acquired hotel and truck stops throughout Canada, and in 1991 bid for ownership of the Ottawa Rough Riders. He was chief executive officer of Home Farms Technologies, a Canadian-based company which was attempting to develop an environmentally friendly waste management system for hog waste. It was a development stage company and has been inactive since 2005 according to Government of Canada records.

In 2011, he received a star on the Italian Walk of Fame in Toronto.

Bobby married Ava, his road manager's daughter in Edmonton in 1975. They had two boys Christopher in 1977 and Michael in 1979 .

Curtola's partner, Karyn Rochford, died in a car accident in Nova Scotia on December 15, 2015.

Curtola had been living in Edmonton, Alberta, Las Vegas, Nevada, and finally Port Mouton, Nova Scotia, but moved back to Edmonton in early 2016 after Rochford's death.

Curtola died at his home in Edmonton on June 4, 2016, at age 73. He was posthumously named into the Canadian Music Hall of Fame in 2019.

Discography

Albums

Compilation albums

Singles

See also

Canadian rock
Music of Canada

References

External links
Official website
Home Farms Technologies website
Rockabilly Hall of Fame
Singles discography
 
 Entry at canadianbands.com
 Entry at thecanadianencyclopedia.ca
 

1943 births
2016 deaths
Businesspeople from Edmonton
Businesspeople from Ontario
Canadian people of Italian descent
Canadian pop singers
Del-Fi Records artists
Members of the Order of Canada
Musicians from Edmonton
Musicians from Thunder Bay
Canadian Music Hall of Fame inductees